Wyuna is a rural locality in the Central Highlands Region, Queensland, Australia.

Wyuna's postcode is 4723 .

History

References 

Central Highlands Region
Localities in Queensland